Prathama means "first" in Sanskrit.

It can refer to:

Prathama (day), the first day in the lunar fortnight (Paksha) of the Hindu calendar.
Prathama Blood Centre, in Ahmedabad